36-38 Argyle Place, Millers Point are a row of heritage-listed terrace houses located at 36-38 Argyle Place, in the inner city Sydney suburb of Millers Point in the City of Sydney local government area of New South Wales, Australia. The property was added to the New South Wales State Heritage Register on 2 April 1999.

History 
Millers Point is one of the earliest areas of European settlement in Australia, and a focus for maritime activities. Argyle Place, a primitive version of a London Square, was commenced by Governor Macquarie but not fully formed until after quarrying of the adjacent rock face had ceased in about 1865. The 1900 Resumption Plan indicates this terrace was owned by James Lawler at that time. First tenanted by the NSW Department of Housing in 1982.

Description 
This Victorian Italianate terrace has three units, two one-bedroom and a double bedsit. It has a corrugated iron roof over a first floor verandah. This two-storey building has an asymmetrical facade; it has a set of three windows in an arch at ground floor with decorative mouldings surrounding and a stone sill under; cast iron balustrades, gates and frieze along verandahs. The first floor has a french door to verandah with side lights and transom lights above. An entrance to the basement is arranged by a narrow stair from the front verandah. Storeys: Three. Construction: Painted stuccoed masonry walls, corrigated galvanised iron roof. Decorative cast iron friezes and balustrades. Painted timber joinery. Style: Victorian Italianate. Orientation: Overlooking Argyle Place.

The external condition of the property is good.

Modifications and dates 
External: Dormer windows at front added . Last inspected: 19 February 1995.

Heritage listing 
As at 23 November 2000, these  terraces are an important streetscape element facing Argyle Place.

It is part of the Millers Point Conservation Area, an intact residential and maritime precinct. It contains residential buildings and civic spaces dating from the 1830s and is an important example of 19th century adaptation of the landscape.

36-38 Argyle Place, Millers Point was listed on the New South Wales State Heritage Register on 2 April 1999.

See also 

Australian residential architectural styles
Osborne House, 34 Argyle Place
40-44 Argyle Place

References

Bibliography

Attribution

External links

 

New South Wales State Heritage Register sites located in Millers Point
Argyle Place, Millers Point, 36-38
Terraced houses in Sydney
Articles incorporating text from the New South Wales State Heritage Register
Italianate architecture in Sydney
1890 establishments in Australia
Houses completed in 1890
Millers Point Conservation Area